In mathematics, an endomorphism is a morphism from a mathematical object to itself.  An endomorphism that is also an isomorphism is an automorphism. For example, an endomorphism of a vector space  is a linear map , and an endomorphism of a group  is a group homomorphism . In general, we can talk about endomorphisms in any category. In the category of sets, endomorphisms are functions from a set S to itself.

Automorphisms

In the following diagram, the arrows denote implication:

Endomorphism rings

Any two endomorphisms of an abelian group, can be added together by the rule . Under this addition, and with multiplication being defined as function composition, the endomorphisms of an abelian group form a ring (the endomorphism ring). The endomorphisms of a vector space or module also form a ring, as do the endomorphisms of any object in a preadditive category. The endomorphisms of a nonabelian group generate an algebraic structure known as a near-ring. Every ring with one is the endomorphism ring of its regular module, and so is a subring of an endomorphism ring of an abelian group; however there are rings that are not the endomorphism ring of any abelian group.

Operator theory
In any concrete category, especially for vector spaces, endomorphisms are maps from a set into itself, and may be interpreted as unary operators on that set, acting on the elements, and allowing the notion of element orbits to be defined, etc.

Depending on the additional structure defined for the category at hand (topology, metric, ...), such operators can have properties like continuity, boundedness, and so on.  More details should be found in the article about operator theory.

Endofunctions
An endofunction is a function whose domain is equal to its codomain. A homomorphic endofunction is an endomorphism.

Let  be an arbitrary set. Every permutation of  has the codomain equal to its domain and is bijective and invertible. If  has more than one element, a constant function on  has an image that is a proper subset of its codomain, and thus is not bijective (and hence not invertible). The function associating to each natural number  the floor of  has its image equal to its codomain and is not invertible.

Finite endofunctions are equivalent to directed pseudoforests. For sets of size  there are  endofunctions on the set.

Particular examples of bijective endofunctions are the involutions; i.e., the functions coinciding with their inverses.

See also
Adjoint endomorphism
Epimorphism (surjective homomorphism)
Frobenius endomorphism
Monomorphism (injective homomorphism)

Notes

References

External links
 

Morphisms